This current 2022–23 of the South African Premier Division is Kaizer Chiefs' 27th consecutive season in the PSL League.

In December 2022 Kaizer Chiefs reached an agreement with the Municipality of Polokwane and signed an agreement to play some of their home games at Peter Mokaba Stadium in Polokwane.

Squad

Season squad 

J

DStv Premiership

Matches

MTN 8 

AmaZulu F.C. progressed to the final of the 2022 MTN 8 after winner with an away-goal after two matches(2 legs) against  Kaizer Chiefs.

Nedbank Cup

Carling Black Label Cup

Sparta MACUFE Cup

Club statistics

Transfers

Transfer-In

Transfer-out

Released

Loaned-out

References

External links 
 Official club website

Kaizer Chiefs F.C. seasons
South African soccer clubs 2022–23 season